Christy Lynette Nockels (née Hill, born November 17, 1973) is an American singer-songwriter of contemporary Christian music. She was also one of the lead members of the band Watermark, along with her husband, Nathan Nockels.

Biography and career
Christy Nockels was born in Fort Worth, Texas to a pastor and a piano teacher but grew up in Oklahoma.

Christy met Nathan Nockels in 1993 at the Christian Artists Seminar in Estes Park, Colorado. After getting married in 1995, they began serving as worship leaders in their local church in Oklahoma City. They also began writing songs together and released an album in 1996. The album, which was released under the name Sons & Daughters, was called Holy Roar, and featured the contribution of fellow worship leader and friend, Charlie Hall. Louie Giglio, pastor and founder of the Passion Movement, heard the album and invited the Nockels and Charlie Hall to attend the first Passion Conference in Austin, Texas, in 1997.

After this, Christy and Nathan moved to Texas and started leading worship for Metro Bible Study, a weekly gathering of 3,000 young adults at Houston's First Baptist Church. During that time Rocketown Records, owned by Michael W. Smith, approached them and they signed a contract under the name Watermark. After that, they moved to Nashville, Tennessee in 1998. As Watermark, the Nockels recorded five albums and received several Dove Award nominations, including Female Vocalist of the Year for Christy and Producer of the Year for Nathan in 2007.

Smith has said of Watermark, "Christy Nockels creates space for worship like few artists I've been around. When she sings, it's disarming--you must pay attention. Whether it's 10,000 people at a Passion Conference or an intimate gathering, Christy is a worshiper who leads us all. Nathan and Christy Nockels are a huge part of the Rocketown Records story, and my life has been enriched by their love for worship music."

In 2006, Christy and Nathan retired Watermark and dedicated themselves to other areas of ministry, as well as their family. In 2008, they moved to Atlanta, Georgia, where they helped to found Passion City Church with Louie Giglio, and signed with sixstepsrecords. Christy also started writing songs and released her first solo album, Life Light Up, in 2009. The album was also produced by her husband, Nathan. In April 2012 Christy released her second solo album Into the Glorious.

On April 28, 2015, Nockels released a new live album, Let It Be Jesus. A review of this release suggests that "[w]ith this newest offering, Christy Nockels reinforces...her position as one of the most respected lead worshipers in the church today."

Personal life
Christy and Nathan Nockels have been married since 1995. They have three children together: Noah, Elliana, and Annie Rose.

Discography

Solo

As Watermark
1998: Watermark
2000: All Things New
2002: Constant
2004: The Purest Place
2006: A Grateful People

As Sons & Daughters
1996: Holy Roar

Awards and nominations

GMA Dove Awards
 2005: Female Vocalist of the Year nomination
 2007: Female Vocalist of the Year nomination
 2008: Female Vocalist of the Year nomination

References

External links
 

1973 births
Living people
20th-century Christians
21st-century American singers
21st-century Christians
American performers of Christian music
Christian music songwriters
People from Fort Worth, Texas
Sixstepsrecords artists
Sparrow Records artists
Performers of contemporary worship music
Performers of contemporary Christian music